Kathanar is an ancient Nasrani Mappila term in Malayalam that means priest. The term is still in colloquial usage, although not in regular formal use. It was anglicized in archaic English texts as Cattanar or Kattanar, especially during 19th century CE or earlier.

Due to the widespread usage of English terminology such as Father, Reverend, Vicar or the Malayalam word Achen or the Syriac word Kasseessa, it mostly fell out of usage in contemporary formal contexts, but recently found a revival among Nasrani Mappilas.

Notable Kathanars
 Kadavil Chandy Kathanar
 Paremmakkal Thoma Kathanar
 Kadamattathu Kathanar
 Nidhiry Mani Kathanar
 Payyappilly Varghese Kathanar
 Rev. George Mathan a.k.a. Geevarghese Kathanar
 Anchal Achan a.k.a. Younan Kathanar
 Iype Thoma Kathanar aka Kovoor Achen
 Dethose Kathanar, who later became Titus I Mar Thoma Metropolitan
 Anjilimoottil Itty Thommen Kathanar
 Malpan Malpane Koonammakkal Thoma Kathanar

See also
 Ecclesiastical Address

References

Christian priests
Malayalam terms
Syriac Christianity